Typhoon Ophelia was a long-lived and powerful tropical cyclone that had devastating impacts on the small atoll of Ulithi in the Caroline Islands. Forming as a tropical depression on November 21, 1960 near Enewetak Atoll, the incipient cyclone struggled to develop. Moving haphazardly along an s-shaped track over the western Pacific Ocean, it degenerated into a disturbance two days later. By November 27, the system reorganized and was classified a tropical depression for a second time well to the southeast of Guam. Moving slowly west-southwest, it steadily intensified into a tropical storm later that day and further into a typhoon on November 29 as it gained a steady westward track.

Maintaining strength as a powerful system for several days, the storm remained over open waters. By December 4, it began to weaken as upper-level winds became unfavorable and forced the cyclone to move northeast. Passing Japan well to the southeast that day, its large circulation brought increased winds to the Tokyo area and heavy rain and snow to parts of the nation. Ophelia soon underwent an extratropical transition as it raced over the open Pacific, completing this structural change by December 6. Its remnants later crossed the International Date Line and dissipated over the Gulf of Alaska on December 10.

Ophelia devastated much of Ulithi during its passage, damaging or destroying most structures and killing two people. Agriculture across the area was decimated and geographic changes to coastlines were noted. In Ophelia's wake, dramatic societal changes in the Ulithian culture arose. Traditional values were abandoned in favor of more western ones, with younger individuals attaining a notable increase in power. The local King was disposed of shortly after the storm and a total change in authority took place. In addition to the severe impact in Ulithi, the typhoon was blamed for the deaths of five fishermen when their vessel collided with a coral reef. The name Ophelia was later retired, though unusually its removal was due to its meteorological significance due to its long track and prolonged time as a significant typhoon rather than for loss of life or damage.

Meteorological history

On November 21, 1960, the formation of a small low-pressure area was noted following a shift in surface winds on Kwajalein Atoll in the Marshall Islands. Slowly developing, the low organized into a tropical depression by 1200 UTC, the 24th of the season. For unknown reasons, the system soon became diffuse and abruptly shifted direction to the east-southeast. Concurrently the cyclone lost its identity as a tropical cyclone and the Joint Typhoon Warning Center (JTWC) discontinued advisories on it by 0600 UTC on November 24. The remnant disturbance subsequently doubled back to the west, bypassing the islands of Pohnpei and Chuuk before re-intensifying.

Roughly 18 hours after regeneration, the depression attained tropical storm status and was assigned the name Ophelia. Initially, Ophelia was forecast to turn northward and impact the Mariana Islands but it ultimately followed a "sinusoidal pattern" path west. Steady intensification took place through November 30, with Ophelia attaining typhoon status at 0000 UTC on November 29. At 0300 UTC on November 30, the eye of Ophelia passed directly over the small atoll of Ulithi in the Caroline Islands; Ulithi Atoll was the only island or land mass over which the eye of the storm passed while warnings were being issued. Sustained winds there reached  while a barometer measured a minimum atmospheric pressure of 939.4 mbar (hPa; 27.744 inHg). Thereafter, Ophelia acquired a more northerly component to its track.

The typhoon attained winds of  while situated roughly halfway between the Philippines and the Mariana Islands at 0600 UTC on December 1. Later that day the storm had turned due north and weakened slightly. The Japan Meteorological Agency estimated the pressure to have been slightly lower, reporting a minimum of 925 mb (hPa; 27.32 inHg). On December 4, strong upper-level westerlies forced the typhoon northeast and prompted dramatic acceleration. The typhoon's eye soon dissolved as the cyclone's structure waned. The briskly moving system crossed the International Date Line later on December 6, along an easterly track before turning north on December 8, south of Alaska. The system subsequently dissipated over the Gulf of Alaska on December 10.

Impact

On November 30, Guam residents were given the all-clear after previously expecting potential impacts from the typhoon, as the storm remained south of the island. Ships in the area were warned to avoid the system, however. The Japanese Maritime Safety Agency reported that two vessels were "in trouble" due to the storm on December 1. A 200-ton ship was driven off-course and collided with a coral reef. Of the 17 crew, 5 were killed in the incident while the other 12 were later rescued by the United States Navy on December 4 and brought to Midway Island. On December 2, storm warnings were raised for the Philippines as Ophelia was forecast to track toward the nation; however following the storm's northward turn these advisories were discontinued the following day. The weakening typhoon later bypassed Japan well to the southeast on December 4. Its outer bands brought heavy rain and snow.

In the wake of the storm, the name Ophelia was retired from usage. For unknown reasons it was not replaced with any particular name, making it one of two storms in the basin to not have a replacement, although Ora took Ophelia's place in 1963. The reason behind Ophelia's removal is unique among Pacific typhoons. Normally, names are stricken from usage due to loss of life and/or damage; however, Ophelia was deemed meteorologically significant for its long track and significant intensity for a prolonged duration.

Ulithi
It was regarded as the worst storm to hit the atoll since 1907 when similarly violent typhoon devastated the area. At the time of the storm, an estimated 450 people lived on the island and 16 members of the United States Coast Guard were stationed there. Residents and coast guard members were first alerted of the storm on November 21 when it was near Enewetak Atoll; however no action was taken. It was not until November 28 when Ophelia began intensifying that precautions were taken. By this time, winds had already begun increasing and the commanding officer ordered that all equipment, personal gear, and emergency rations were to be taken into a concrete shelter. Natives were not entirely prepared for the typhoon, with two villages receiving no word of its approach. Three villages that were informed were not given the necessary urgency of the typhoon and did not expect the severity of damage the occurred. A Trust Territory vessel, the MV Errol, was anchored in the lagoon but left without warning nearby natives on November 29.

Striking as a Category 4-equivalent typhoon, Ophelia produced devastating winds across the atoll. Winds estimated at  battered Ulithi, reportedly destroying every structure except for the concrete coast guard station. The station itself was badly affected, however, with its walls damaged and windows blown out. Nearby Falalop Airfield had  of its runway swept away. Most structures across Ulithi were constructed after World War II and had tin roofs. Natives sought refuge in these structures and in many instances were forced to abandon them as they fell apart during the storm.

On Falalop Island, the seawall erected during World War II was entirely destroyed and allowed storm surge to inundate the island; however, at no point was the entire island under water. Along the south shore, waves reached  and caused moderate beach erosion. Along the south shore, two children were killed when their home collapsed, pinning them underneath debris, and water later inundated the area and drowned them. Elsewhere on the island, three people sustained minor injuries. Asor Island experienced most of its flooding as the backside of Ophelia moved through. Flying debris resulted in one injury on both Asor and Mogmog.

Across Ulithi, 29 homes were destroyed, 64 were damaged, and the remaining 33 were intact. Of the 79 non-residential structures, only 4 were left standing. All four schools and medical buildings were destroyed, with nearly all medical supplies being washed away. Agriculture saw extensive losses with nearly the entire taro crop devastated and more than 75% of the food crop was ruined. Roughly 23% of the coconut trees were destroyed and 45% were damaged. It took approximately two years for the coconut crop to return to normal. Banana and breadfruit trees were temporarily useless, though they were in recoverable statuses.

Aftermath
In the months and years after the typhoon, natives in Ulithi were examined for increased levels of stress. Unexpectedly, only a handful of people reported symptoms of posttraumatic stress disorder, with the majority seemingly unfazed by Ophelia. There was some talk among residents of leaving Ulithi and moving to nearby islands such as Yap, Palau, Saipan, or even the Philippines; however, mentions of this diminished relatively quickly. The devastation to the island's infrastructure hastened a previously gradual change in buildings. Reconstruction efforts had entirely abandoned traditional Ulithi building styles in favor of more modern ones. The survival of concrete buildings prompted an overall desire among people to construct all buildings with concrete. Alongside the infrastructural overhaul, a shift in dietary changes to a more western style occurred.

Further social changes brought about by the presence of American military personnel were exemplified in the storm's wake. The use of currency as a means for obtaining goods was first seen in Ulithi in 1956, four years before the typhoon. However, despite the total destruction of markets by Ophelia they were quickly rebuilt, depicting the quick entrenchment of currency in native culture. The reconstruction also accelerated a desire for new goods from trading. Store owners requested a wider range of material to have in stock than seen previously. From a societal standpoint, Ophelia prompted great advances in the Ulithian culture. Women, previously limited to agriculture, housework, and eventually shopping, were found to be doing heavy work (i.e. carpentry, chopping, digging, and lifting) in the immediate wake of the typhoon. A shift in government took place as well, with authority of King Malefich waning to greater power among younger individuals. Malefich also displayed great ineptitude during the storm and was subsequently disposed of as King following Ophelia's passage. The changes in authority occurred due to spontaneous leadership during the storm by the younger persons in order to protect others. Prior to the typhoon, younger members of tribes never spoke during council meetings; however, by 1961 they made their presence known in such meetings.

See also

List of retired Pacific typhoon names (JMA)
Typhoon Rita (1972)
Typhoon Wayne (1986)
Hurricane John (1994)
Hurricane Ioke

Notes

References
General

Specific

External links
JMA General Information of Typhoon Ophelia (6026) from Digital Typhoon

1960 Pacific typhoon season
Retired Pacific typhoons
Typhoons in the Federated States of Micronesia
Typhoons